Byron C. Ostby (August 17, 1924 – April 28, 2003) was elected a member of the Wisconsin State Assembly at the age of 24, while still in law school.

Biography
Ostby was born on August 17, 1924, in Superior, Wisconsin, son of Brynjulf Ostby and Ingeborg C. (Lerann) Ostby. During World War II, he served with the United States Navy. Ostby then received his bachelor and law degrees from University of Wisconsin–Madison and then practiced law. He served as honorary consul for Norway and was executive of the Wisconsin Railroad Association. As Honorary Consul to Norway, he was knighted by the king of Norway for his service. His parents (Brynjulf and Ingeborg) were also knighted by King Haakon. He married Helen Wear September 8, 1951, and had three children, Helen Signe Ostby, David Joel Ostby, and Laurie Ostby Kehler.  He died in Madison, Wisconsin.

Political career
Ostby, a Republican, was a member of the Wisconsin State Assembly from Douglas County 1st District, 1949 to 1951.

References

Politicians from Superior, Wisconsin
University of Wisconsin–Madison alumni
University of Wisconsin Law School alumni
Businesspeople from Wisconsin
Wisconsin lawyers
Republican Party members of the Wisconsin State Assembly
Military personnel from Wisconsin
United States Navy sailors
United States Navy personnel of World War II
1924 births
2003 deaths
20th-century American politicians
20th-century American businesspeople
20th-century American lawyers